The known history of Gaza spans 4,000 years. Gaza was ruled, destroyed and repopulated by various dynasties, empires, and peoples. Originally a Canaanite settlement, it came under the control of the ancient Egyptians for roughly 350 years before being conquered and becoming one of the Philistines' principal cities. Gaza became part of the Assyrian Empire around 730 BCE. Alexander the Great besieged and captured the city in 332 BCE. Most of the inhabitants were killed during the assault, and the city, which became a center for Hellenistic learning and philosophy, was resettled by nearby Bedouins. The area changed hands regularly between two Greek successor-kingdoms, the Seleucids of Syria and the Ptolemies of Egypt, until it was besieged and taken by the Hasmoneans in 96 BCE.

Gaza was rebuilt by Roman General Pompey Magnus, and granted to Herod the Great thirty years later. Throughout the Roman period, Gaza maintained its prosperity, receiving grants from several different emperors. A 500-member senate governed the city, which had a diverse population of Greeks, Romans, Jews, Egyptians, Persians and Nabateans. Conversion to Christianity in the city was spearheaded and completed under Saint Porphyrius, who destroyed its eight pagan temples between 396 and 420 CE. Gaza was conquered by the Muslim general Amr ibn al-'As in 637 CE, and most Gazans adopted Islam during early Muslim rule. Thereafter, the city went through periods of prosperity and decline. The Crusaders wrested control of Gaza from the Fatimids in 1100, but were driven out by Saladin. Gaza was in Mamluk hands by the late 13th century, and became the capital of a province that stretched from the Sinai Peninsula to Caesarea. It witnessed a golden age under the Ottoman-appointed Ridwan dynasty in the 16th century.

Gaza experienced destructive earthquakes in 1903 and 1914. In 1917, during World War I, British forces captured the city. Gaza grew significantly in the first half of the 20th century under Mandatory rule. The population of the city swelled as a result of the Palestinian exodus during the 1948 Arab–Israeli War. Gaza came under Egyptian rule until it was occupied by Israel during the 1967 Six-Day War. Gaza became a center of political activism during the First Intifada, and under the Oslo Accords of 1993, it was assigned to be under the direct control of the newly established Palestinian Authority. Israel unilaterally withdrew from Gaza in 2005. By 2007, Hamas emerged both as the victor in Palestinian elections and in factional fighting with rival Fatah in the city and in the wider Gaza Strip and has since been the sole governing authority. Israel subsequently blockaded the Strip and launched assaults against it in 2008–2009, 2012 and 2014, as a response to rocket attacks.

Bronze Age
Settlement in the region of Gaza dates back to 3300–3000 BCE at Tell as-Sakan, a site located south of the present-day city, which began as an Ancient Egyptian fortress built in Canaanite territory. Tell as-Sakan prospered as Canaanite cities began to trade agricultural goods with the Egyptians. However, when Egypt's economic interests shifted to the cedar trade with Lebanon, Gaza's role was reduced to that of a port for ships carrying goods and it declined economically. The site was virtually abandoned and remained so throughout the Early Bronze Age II.

Gaza enjoyed demographic and economic growth again when the local Canaanite population began to resettle Tell as-Sakan around 2500, but in 2250, the area experienced a total collapse of civilization and all of the cities in the Gaza region were abandoned by the 23rd century BCE. In its place emerged semi-nomadic cultures with pastoral camps made up of rustic family dwellings which continued to exist throughout the Early Bronze Age IV. An urban center known as Tell al-Ajjul began to arise inland along the Wadi Ghazza riverbed. During the Middle Bronze Age, Tell as-Sakan was the southernmost locality in Canaanite territory, serving as a fort, and by 1650 BCE, while Egypt was occupied by the Canaanite Hyksos, a second city developed on the ruins of the first Tell as-Sakan. This city was destroyed about a century later, when the Hyksos were routed from Egypt. Egypt settled Gaza once again and Tell al-Ajjul rose for the third time in the 15th century BCE. The city finally ceased to exist in the 14th century, at the end of the Bronze Age.

Ancient period

A city which would become present-day Gaza began to develop on the site of Tell al-Ajjul. This city served as Egypt's administrative capital in Canaan, and was the residence of the Egyptian governor of the region. A caravan point of strategic importance from the earliest times, it was constantly involved in the wars between Egypt and Syria and the Mesopotamian powers. For instance, Egyptian pharaoh Ahmose I completed his victory over the Hyksos by conquering their stronghold Sharuhen near Gaza after a three-year siege. In addition, Gaza appeared frequently in Egyptian and Assyrian records. Under Tuthmosis III, it is mentioned on the Syrian-Egyptian caravan route and in the Amarna letters as "ḫazzatu". However, Gaza was in Egyptian hands for 350 years, until it was settled by the Philistines, a seafaring people with cultural links to the Aegean, in the 12th century BCE, following their defeat against Ramesses III. It then became a part of the pentapolis; a league of the Philistines' five most important city-states.

The Hebrew Bible mentions the Avvites occupying an area that extended as far as Gaza, and that these people were dispossessed by the  Caphtorites from the island of Caphtor (modern Crete). Some scholars speculate that the Philistines were descendants of the Caphtorites.

Gaza is also mentioned in the Hebrew Bible as the place where Samson was imprisoned and met his death. The prophets Amos and Zephaniah are believed to have prophesied that Gaza would be deserted. According to biblical accounts, Gaza fell to Israelite rule, from the reign of King David in the early 11th century BCE. When the United Monarchy split in about 930 BCE, Gaza became a part of the northern Kingdom of Israel. When the Kingdom of Israel fell to the Assyrians under Tiglath-Pileser III and Sargon II around 730 BCE, Gaza came under Assyrian rule. In the 7th century, it again came under Egyptian control, but during the Persian period (6th–4th centuries BCE) it enjoyed a certain independence and flourished. In 601/600 BCE, Babylonian king Nebuchadnezzar II was defeated against the Egyptian army under pharaoh Necho II at Migdol near Gaza; however, it was captured by him during his second unsuccessful campaign to invade Egypt in 568 BCE. In 529 BCE, Cambyses I unsuccessfully attacked Gaza and later, around 520 BCE, the Greeks established a trading post in Gaza. The first coins were minted on the Athens model around 380 BCE.

Alexander the Great besieged Gaza—the last city to resist his conquest on his path to Egypt—for five months, finally capturing it in 332 BCE. Led by a eunuch named Batis and defended by Arab mercenaries, Gaza withstood the siege for two months, until it was overcome by storm. The defenders, mostly local elements, fought to the death and the women and children were taken as captives. The city was resettled by neighboring Bedouins, who were sympathetic to Alexander's rule. He then organized the city into a polis or "city-state" and Greek culture took root in Gaza which gained a reputation as a flourishing center of Hellenic learning and philosophy. Belonging at first to the Ptolemaic kingdom, it passed after 200 BCE to the Seleucids.

In the 1st century BCE and the first half of that century, it was the Mediterranean port of the Nabateans, whose caravans arrived there from Petra or from Elath on the Red Sea. In 96 BCE, the Hasmonean king Alexander Jannaeus besieged the city for a year, which had sided with Ptolemy IX Soter against him. The inhabitants, who had hoped for help from the Nabatean king Aretas II, were killed and their city destroyed by Jannaeus when Aretas did not come to their aid.

Classical antiquity

Roman empire
Gaza was rebuilt by consul Aulus Gabinius after it was incorporated into the Roman Empire in 63 BCE, under the command of Pompey Magnus. Roman rule brought six centuries of relative peace and prosperity to the city—which became a busy port and locus of trade between the Middle East and Africa.

In the Acts of the Apostles, Gaza is mentioned as being on the desert route from Jerusalem to Ethiopia. The Christian gospel was explained to an Ethiopian eunuch along this road by Philip the Evangelist, and he was baptised in some nearby water.

Gaza was granted to Herod the Great by Roman emperor Augustus in 30 BCE, where it formed a separate unit within his kingdom; and Cosgabar, the governor of Idumea, was in charge of the city's affairs. On the division of Herod's kingdom, it was placed under the proconsul of Syria. After Herod's death in 4 BCE, Augustus annexed it to the Province of Syria. In 66 CE, Gaza was burned down by Jews during their rebellion against the Romans. However, it remained an important city; even more so after the destruction of Jerusalem by Titus the following year. Titus passed through Gaza on his march toward to Jerusalem, and again in his return. The establishment of the Roman province of Arabia Petraea restored trade links with Petra and Aila.

Throughout the Roman period, Gaza was a prosperous city and received grants and attention from several emperors. A 500-member senate governed Gaza, and a diverse variety of Philistines, Greeks, Romans, Canaanites, Phoenicians, Jews, Egyptians, Persians and Bedouin populated the city. Gaza's mint stamped out coins adorned with the busts of gods and emperors, including Gordian III. During his visit in 130 CE, Emperor Hadrian, who favored Gaza, personally inaugurated wrestling, boxing and oratorical competitions in Gaza's new stadium, which soon became known from Alexandria to Damascus. The city was adorned with many pagan temples—the main cult being that of Marnas. Other temples were dedicated to Zeus, Helios, Aphrodite, Apollo, Athena and the local deity Tyche.

The spread of Christianity in Gaza was initiated by Philip the Arab around 250 CE; first in the port of Maiuma, but later into the city. The religion faced obstacles as it spread through the inland population because pagan worship was strong. In 299, an unverified number of local Christians who assembled in Gaza to hear the Scriptures read were seized and mutilated by the Romans. Also, its Christians were harshly repressed during the Diocletianic Persecution in 303. The first bishop of Gaza was Philemon, believed to have been one of the 72 disciples, but the first cleric was Saint Silvanus who, during the persecution by Maximinus Daia in 310, was arrested along with about 30 other Christians, and condemned to death.

With reorganization of the Roman provinces under Diocletian, Gaza became part of Palaestina Prima, one of the Late Roman provinces. The official recognition of Christianity by Constantine I did not increase sympathy of the religion in Gaza. Although Gaza was represented by Bishop Asclepas in the First Council of Nicaea in 325, the vast majority of its inhabitants continued to worship the native gods.  As the Roman Empire was crumbling at this time, Gaza remained unaffected.  At this time, the inhabitants of Maiuma reportedly converted to Christianity en masse.  Constantine II decided to separate it from pagan Gaza in 331, giving Maiuma its own episcopal see.  Julian reversed the process during his reign in the latter half of the 4th century.  Although Maiuma had its own bishop, clergy, and diocesan territory, it shared its magistrates and administration with Gaza.  Upon Julian's death, Maiuma's independence was restored and the rivalry between it and Gaza intensified.

During most of the 4th century, the Christian community was small, poor, and carried no influence in the city.  The church was insignificant and its members were not allowed to hold political office.  However, conversion to Christianity in Gaza was spearheaded under Saint Porphyrius between 396 and 420. The main source for pagan–Christian tensions in Gaza at this time is Porphyrius' biographer, Mark the Deacon. In 402, after obtaining a decree from the emperor Arcadius, all eight of the city's pagan temples were destroyed and non-Christian worship was forbidden by the envoy Cynegius, replacing persecution of the Christians with persecution of pagans in the late Roman Empire.  Paganism continued despite persecution, and according to the traditional Christian history, Christians were still persecuted in the city, resulting in Porphyrius undertaking more measures.  As a result of his persuasion, Empress Aelia Eudocia commissioned the construction of a church atop the ruins of the temple of Marnas in 406.  Note, that according to MacMullen it is likely that Porphyrius did not even exist.  The alleged persecution against Christians, according to traditional Christian history, did not cease, but it was less harsh and frequent than previously. A large 6th century synagogue with a mosaic tile floor depicting King David was discovered in Gaza.  An inscription states that the floor was donated in 508–509 CE by two merchant brothers.  Around 540, Gaza became the starting point for pilgrimages to the Sinai Peninsula. It was an important city in the early Christian world and many famous scholars taught at its academy of rhetoric, including 6th-century scholar Procopius of Gaza. The celebrated Church of Saint Sergius was built in this century.

Depicted in the mosaic Map of Madaba of 600, Gaza was the most important political and commercial center on the southern coast of Palestine. Its northern municipal border was marked by Wadi al-Hesi, just before Ashkelon, and its southern boundary is unknown, but Gaza's jurisdiction did not reach Raphia. The towns of Bethelea, Asalea, Gerarit and Kissufim were included in Gaza's territories. Its large representation, approximately half of which is preserved, cannot be easily explained, mainly because only small tentative excavations have been made there and because ancient Gaza is covered by the still-inhabited Old City.

Arab caliphates

Rashidun rule
There were already converts to Islam among the city's Greek-speaking Christian population before Gaza's capitulation to the Muslims. At the near end of the Byzantine era, Gaza had become the home of an increasingly influential group of Arab traders from Mecca, including Umar ibn al-Khattab, who later became the second ruler of the Islamic Caliphate. Muhammad visited the city more than once before being a prophet of Islam.

In 634, Gaza was besieged by the Rashidun army under general 'Amr ibn al-'As, with assistance from Khalid ibn al-Walid, following the Battle of Ajnadayn between the Byzantine Empire and the Rashidun Caliphate in central Palestine. The Muslims' victory at Ajnadayn gave them control over much of Palestine's countryside, but not the major cities with garrisons such as Gaza. With Umar succeeding Abu Bakr as caliph (head of the Caliphate), the Rashidun forces began to make stronger efforts at conquering Byzantine territory. During the three-year siege of Gaza, the city's Jewish community fought alongside the Byzantine garrison. In the summer of 637, Amr's forces broke the siege and captured Gaza, killing its Byzantine garrison, but not attacking its inhabitants. Amr's victory is attributed to a combination of Arab strategy, Byzantine weakness, and the influence of Gaza's Arab residents. Believed to be the site where Muhammad's great grandfather Hashim ibn Abd Manaf—who also lived as a merchant in Gaza—was buried, the city was not destroyed by the victorious Arab army.

The arrival of the Muslim Arabs brought drastic changes to Gaza; its churches were transformed into mosques, including the Cathedral of John the Baptist (previously the Temple of Marnas) which became the Great Mosque of Gaza. Gaza's population adopted Islam as their religion relatively quick in contrast with the city's countryside. Eventually, Arabic became the official language. The Christian population was reduced to an insignificant minority and the Samaritan residents deposited their property with their high priest and fled the city east upon the Muslim conquest. Gaza was placed under the administration of Jund Filastin ("District of Palestine") of Bilad al-Sham province during Rashidun rule, and continued to be a part of the district under the successive caliphates of the Umayyads and Abbasids.

Arab dynasties
Under the Umayyads Gaza served as a minor administrative center. In 672 an earthquake struck the city but there are few details of its effects. Under the caliph-appointed governors, Christians and Jews were taxed, though their worship and trade continued, as noted in the writings of the bishop Saint Willibald, who visited the city in 723. The year 750 saw the end of Umayyad rule in Palestine and the arrival of the Abbasids, with Gaza becoming a center for the writing of Islamic law. In 767, Muhammad ibn Idris ash-Shafi'i was born in Gaza and lived his early childhood there; al-Shafi'i founded one of the prominent fiqhs (schools of law) of Sunni Islam, named Shafi'i after him.

In 796 the city was laid waste during a civil war by the Arab tribes of the area. Gaza apparently recovered by the 9th century according to Persian geographer Istakhri who wrote that merchants grew rich there "for this place was a great market for the people of the Hejaz." A Christian writer, writing in 867, described it as "rich in all things". Gaza's port, however, occasionally succumbed to neglect under Arab rule and an overall decline in commerce followed because of infighting among Palestine's rulers and Bedouin bandits who disrupted overland trade routes towards the city.

From 868 to 905 the Tulunids ruled Gaza, and around 909, the influence of the Fatimids from Egypt started to grow, leading to a slow decline of the city. The orange was introduced to the area, arriving from India in 943. In 977, the Fatimids established an agreement with the Seljuk Turks, whereby the Fatimids would control Gaza and the land south of it, including Egypt. By the 985 CE, while under Fatimid rule, the Arab geographer al-Muqaddasi described Gaza as "a large town lying on the highroad to Egypt on the border of the desert. There is here a beautiful mosque, also to be seen is the monument for the Khalif Umar." The Arabic-language poet Abu Ishaq Ibrahim al-Ghazzi was born in the city in 1049.

Crusader and Ayyubid rule

The Crusaders wrested control of Gaza from the Fatimids in 1100. According to the chronicler William of Tyre, the Crusaders found it uninhabited and in ruins. Unable to totally refortify the hilltop on which Gaza was built, due to a lack of resources, King Baldwin III built a small castle there in 1149. The possession of Gaza completed the military encirclement of the Fatimid-held city of Ascalon to the north. After the castle's construction, Baldwin granted it and the surrounding region to the Knights Templar. He also had the Great Mosque converted into the Cathedral of Saint John.

In 1154, the Arab traveler al-Idrisi wrote Gaza "is today very populous and in the hands of the Crusaders." William of Tyre confirms that in 1170, a civilian population was persuaded to occupy the area outside the castle and establish feeble fortifications and gates surrounding the community. That same year, King Amalric I of Jerusalem withdrew Gaza's Templars to assist him against an Egypt-based Ayyubid force led by Saladin at nearby Darum. However, Saladin evaded the Crusader force and assaulted Gaza instead, destroying the town built outside the castle's walls and killing its inhabitants after they were refused refuge in the castle, managed by Miles of Plancy at the time. Seven years later, the Templars prepared for another defense of Gaza against Saladin, but this time his forces fell on Ascalon. In 1187, following Ascalon's capitulation, the Templars surrendered Gaza in return for the release of their master Gerard of Ridefort. Saladin then ordered the destruction of the city's fortifications in 1191. A year later, after recapturing it, Richard the Lionheart apparently refortified the city, but the walls were dismantled as a result of the Treaty of Ramla agreed upon months later in 1193.

According to geographer Abu al-Fida, Gaza was a medium-sized city, possessing gardens and a seashore in the early 13th century. The Ayyubids constructed the Shuja'iyya neighborhood—the first extension of Gaza beyond the Old City.

Mamluk rule
Ayyubid rule virtually ended in 1260, after the Mongols under Hulagu Khan completely destroyed Gaza—Hulagu's southernmost point of conquest. Hulagu left his army in Gaza after being recalled due to the death of the Mongol emperor, and Mamluk general az-Zahir Baybars subsequently drove the Mongols out of the city and again defeated them at Baysan in the Galilee. He was proclaimed sultan of Egypt on his way back from the battlefield after the assassination of Sultan Qutuz. Baibars passed through Gaza six times during his expeditions against the remnants of the Crusader states and the Mongols between 1263 and 1269. Mamluk domination started in 1277, with Gaza initially being a small village in the territory of Ramla. In 1279, Sultan al-Mansur Qalawun encamped in Gaza for fifty days while on a march against the Mongols.

In 1293, Qalawun's son an-Nasir Muhammad instituted Gaza as the capital of the province that bore its name, Mamlakat Ghazzah (the Governorship of Gaza). This province covered the coastal plain from Rafah in the south to just north of Caesarea, extending in the east to the western slopes of Samaria and the Hebron Hills; its major towns were Qaqun, Ludd, and Ramla. In 1294, an earthquake devastated Gaza, and five years later the Mongols again destroyed all that was restored by the Mamluks. That same year, Gaza was the center of a conspiracy against Sultan al-Adil Kitbugha, but the plot was detected and crushed before being carried out.

The Syrian geographer al-Dimashqi described Gaza in 1300 as "so rich in trees it looks like a cloth of brocade spread out upon the land". He accounted to Gaza the cities and towns of Ascalon, Jaffa, Caesarea, Arsuf, Deir al-Balah, al-Arish (in north-central the Sinai), Bayt Jibrin, Karatiyya, Hebron and Jerusalem—all of which had their own sub-governors. Emir Baibars al-Ala'i ruled Mamlakat Ghazzah between 1307 and 1310, during the second reign of an-Nasir Muhammad until the latter was briefly overthrown by Baybars al-Jashnakir. Gaza was one of the places that returned to the allegiance of the exiled sultan; in 1310, an-Nasir Muhammad defeated Sultan Baybars in Gaza, forcing the latter to surrender his throne to him. Baybars was imprisoned in the city.

Emir Sanjar al-Jawli acquired the governorship of Gaza and central Palestine in 1311. He highly favored Gaza and transformed it into a flourishing city, having built in it a horse-race course, a madrasa (college), a mosque, a khan (caravansary), a maristan (hospital), and a castle. In late 1332, coinciding with the appointment of Emir Taynal al-Ashrafi as governor, some of the provincial privileges of Gaza, such as the governor's direct subordination to the sultan in Cairo, were removed by an-Nasir Muhammad's decree. From then, and until 1341 when Sanjar al-Jawli served a second term as governor, Gaza became subordinate to the na'ib as-saltana (viceroy) of Syria, Emir Tankiz al-Husami.

In 1348 the bubonic plague spread to the city, killing the majority of its inhabitants, and in 1352, Gaza suffered a destructive flood—which was rare in that arid part of Palestine. However, by 1355, the Berber traveler Ibn Battuta visited the city and noted that it was "large and populous, and has many mosques. But there were no walls round it. There was here of old a fine Jami' Mosque (the Great Mosque), but the one present[ly] used was built by Amir Jawli [Sanjar al-Jawli]."

In the early 1380s, the governor of Gaza, Akbuga Safawi, plotted to commit treason against Sultan az-Zahir Barquq. The plot was detected and Safawi was exiled to al-Karak, and replaced by Husam al-Din ibn Bakish. Soon after, the city fell into the hands of Emir Yalbugha an-Nasiri who revolted against Barquq. Gaza was retaken without violence, and Ibn Bakish met Yalbugha at its gates with gifts and proposals of peace. The unseated Barquq regained his throne in 1389, and retook Gaza the next year. In 1401 a swarm of locusts destroyed Gaza's crops. A battle between the rival Mamluk emirs Akbirdi and Qansuwa Khamsiyah occurred in Gaza; Khamsiyah had failed in usurping the Mamluk throne and fled to Gaza where he made his unsuccessful last stand. Between 1428 and 1433, Gaza was governed by Emir Sayf ad-Din Inal, who would later become sultan in 1453. During his sultanate, in 1455, Inal's dawadar (executive secretary) had the Madrasa of Birdibak built in the Shuja'iyya neighborhood.

Ottoman era

Early Ottoman rule and the Ridwan dynasty
In 1516, Gaza—by now a small town with an inactive port, ruined buildings and reduced trade—was incorporated into the Ottoman Empire. The Ottoman army quickly and efficiently crushed a small-scale uprising, and the local population generally welcomed them as fellow Sunni Muslims.
Shortly after Palestine's quick submission to the Ottomans, it was divided into six districts, including the Gaza Sanjak (District of Gaza) which stretched from Jaffa in the north to Bayt Jibrin in the east and Rafah in the south. The sanjak was a part of the larger Damascus Eyalet or the "Province of Damascus".

An early governor of Gaza Sanjak was Kara Shahin Mustafa, a former jannissary (member of a military corps) who rose to become an elite military officer and state minister and eventually a vizier and trusted aide of Sultan Suleiman the Magnificent. He received the governorship of Gaza apparently as an interim appointment before he was appointed Governor of Egypt, although he was deposed three years later by Sultan Selim II. Mustafa died a short while later and his son Ridwan Pasha, who was the treasurer of Yemen, became governor shortly before Mustafa's death. The Ridwan dynasty, which would rule Gaza for over a century, derives its name from Ridwan Pasha. He was later appointed Governor of Yemen, but was deposed two years later and returned to the governorship of Gaza. After becoming governor of Ethiopia, Basra, and Diyarbakır in that order, he successfully led an Ottoman contingent against Safavid Persia in 1579. The sultan then awarded him the province of Anatolia where he died in 1585.

Although no explanation is provided in the biographies of the Ridwan family, it is evident they chose Gaza as their home and the place for their castle. Ridwan Pasha's son Ahmad Pasha succeeded him and governed Gaza for thirty years, sometimes incorporating the sanjaks of Nablus and Jerusalem. He became Governor of Damascus Eyalet in 1601 after bribing several viziers and bureaucrats in Istanbul and died in 1607. Next in line was Hasan Pasha ibn Ahmad who became known 'Arab Hasan ("Hasan the Bedouin") because by then, the Ridwans were identified with the control and knowledge of the Bedouin. He successfully led his pro-Ottoman Bedouin troops against the army of the rebel Fakhr ad-Din in a series of battles. He was later appointed Governor of Tripoli in Lebanon, but he was deposed in 1644. 'Arab Hasan had many wives and concubines and 85 children. He led the Ridwans successfully militarily, however, he burdened the dynasty with heavy debt.

'Arab Hasan's son Husayn Pasha was governor of Nablus and Jerusalem, and inherited the impoverished governorship of Gaza when his father died. He borrowed a large sum from the French in order to meet the heavy taxes imposed on the city by Hassan Aga, governor Sidon Eyalet—the province that Gaza briefly belonged to. Husayn's period in office was peaceful and prosperous for the city, and he gained a good reputation for considerably reducing the strife between the nearby Bedouins and the settled population. He appointed his son Ibrahim to be governor of the Gaza and Jerusalem sanjaks, but when Ibrahim was killed during an expedition against the Druze in Mount Lebanon in 1660, Husayn resumed control of Gaza. That year, Gaza was designated the capital of Palestine, indicating the city's rapid recovery. The Great Mosque was restored, and six other mosques constructed, while Turkish baths and market stalls proliferated. Anonymous petitions from Damascus sent to Istanbul complaining about Husayn's failure to protect the Hajj caravan and his alleged pro-Christian tendencies, however, served as an excuse for the Ottoman government to depose him. He was soon imprisoned in Damascus and his assets confiscated by provincial authorities. He was later sent to Istanbul and died in prison there in 1663.

Husayn's brother Musa Pasha then governed Gaza into the early 1670s, implementing an anti-French and anti-Christian regime to appease the Ottoman government. Soon after his reign ended, Ottomans officials were appointed to govern. The Ridwan period is considered Gaza's last golden age during Ottoman rule and the city gradually dwindled after they were removed from office.

In 1723, the Ottomans appointed Salih Pasha Tuqan of the Nablus-based Tuqan family to govern Gaza and two other sanjaks until his death in 1742. In the 1750s, a local Bedouin tribes disposed of the plunder from a Meccan caravan, consisting of 13,000 camel-loads of goods, into Gaza's markets, boosting the city's wealth. The attack on the caravan was a reprisal to the Ottomans who had recently replaced the governor of Damascus. In 1763, there was a revolt in Gaza against the Ottomans. Then, in November 1770, Ali Bey al-Kabir, the rebellious Mamluk sultan of Egypt, sent troops to Gaza to aid Zahir al-Umar in the Galilee, helping him check the power of the Ottomans in the Levant. Gaza was briefly occupied by the French Army under Napoleon Bonaparte, who referred to it as "the outpost of Africa, the door to Asia", in 1799. Most of its inhabitants fled as a result. His forces easily razed the remains of the city walls (which had not been rebuilt since their destruction by Saladin), but abandoned the city after their failed siege of Acre that same year. The duration of French influence in Gaza was too short to have a palpable effect.

Egyptian rule and Ottoman revival

Gaza was culturally dominated by neighboring Egypt from the early 19th century; Muhammad Ali of Egypt conquered it and most of Palestine in 1832. Strangely, in 1833, Muhammad Ali instructed his son Ibrahim Pasha not to purchase Gaza's cotton harvest (cotton production was Ali's main source of wealth and Egypt's production was low that year), instead allowing its residents to dispose of it how they wished.

American scholar Edward Robinson visited Gaza in 1838, describing it as a "thickly populated" town larger than Jerusalem, with its Old City lying upon a hilltop, while its suburbs laid on the nearby plain. He further stated that its soil was rich and supported groves of "delicious and abundant" apricots and mulberries. Although  Gaza's port was by then inactive, it benefited from trade and commerce because of its position on the caravan route between Egypt and Syria, as well as from the production of soap and cotton for trade with the Bedouin. The governor of Gaza at the time was Sheikh Sa'id. Robinson noted that virtually all of Gaza's vestiges of ancient history and antiquity had disappeared due to constant conflict and occupation.

The Bubonic Plague struck again in 1839 and the city stagnated, as it lacked political and economic stability. In 1840, Egyptian and Ottoman troops battled outside of Gaza, with the Ottomans emerging victorious, effectively ending Egyptian rule over Palestine. The battles brought about more death and destruction, just barely after the city began to recover from the plague. The Church of Saint Porphyrius was renovated in 1856, and in 1874, French orientalist Charles Clermont-Ganneau visited Gaza, gathering and cataloging a sizable collection of Byzantine inscriptions and describing the city's Great Mosque in detail. Sultan Abdul Hamid II had the wells of Gaza restored in 1893.

Although the first municipal council of Gaza was formed in 1893 under the chairmanship of Ali Khalil Shawa, modern mayorship began in 1906 with his son Said al-Shawa, who was appointed mayor by Ottoman authorities. Like other regions and cities in Palestine at the time, Gaza was economically and politically dominated by a number of powerful clans, particularly the Shawa, Husseini, and Sourani families. Two destructive earthquakes occurred in 1903 and 1914.

When World War I erupted in 1917, British forces were defeated by the Ottomans in the first and second Battle of Gaza. General Edmund Allenby, leading the Allied Forces, finally conquered Gaza in a third battle.

British rule

After the First World War, the League of Nations granted quasi-colonial authority over former Ottoman territories to Great Britain and France, with Gaza becoming part of the British Mandate of Palestine.

During the 1929 Palestine riots, the Jewish Quarter of Gaza was destroyed and most of Gaza's fifty Jewish families fled the city. In the 1930s and 1940s, Gaza underwent major expansion, with new neighborhoods, such as Rimal and Zeitoun being built along the coast, and the southern and eastern plains. Areas damaged in the riots underwent reconstruction. Most of the funding for these developments came from international organizations and missionary groups.

Egyptian control

At the conclusion of the 1948 Arab–Israeli War, Egypt was in  control of Gaza and the surrounding area, that came to be called the Gaza Strip. Gaza's growing population was augmented by an influx of refugees fleeing nearby cities, towns and villages that were captured by Israel. From 1948 until 1959, Gaza was nominally under the jurisdiction of the All-Palestine Government, an entity established by the Arab League during the 1948 Arab–Israeli War, purportedly as the government for a liberated Palestine. However, the government was ineffective with little or no influence over events in Gaza and was dissolved by Cairo in 1959. Egyptian occupation of the Gaza Strip was broken for four months during the 1956 Suez Crisis.

Upon the withdrawal of Israeli forces, Egyptian president Gamal Abdel Nasser issued several reforms in Gaza, including the expansion of educational opportunities and civil services, provision of housing and the establishment of local security forces. As in Egypt, political activity in Gaza was severely curtailed, but the government-sponsored Arab National Union was established in place of the All-Palestine Government that Nasser abolished in 1959, which gave the city's citizens a greater voice in national politics. In 1959, with the abolishment of the All-Palestine Government, Gaza officially became a part of the United Arab Republic, a union of Syria and Egypt, under the pan-Arab policy of Nasser. In reality, however, Gaza was under direct Egyptian military governorship, which also continued upon the withdrawal of Syria from the UAR shortly afterwards. When the Palestinian Liberation Organization (PLO) was founded in 1964, Nasser formally, but not practically, proclaimed that it would hold authority over Gaza, and a year later, conscription was instituted for the Palestinian Liberation Army.

Israeli control

Gaza was occupied by Israel in the 1967 Six-Day War after the defeat of a coalition of Arab armies. Under Israeli occupation, existing structures of administration in Gaza would be maintained and administrative tasks would continue to be executed by Palestinian civil servants. Although this policy of "government but not administration" was declared, some felt that the Israeli military frequently interfered in the city's administration in order to control local violent incidents. In the immediate aftermath of the 1967 War, the military governor of Gaza threatened to dismiss the municipal council and cut off utility services if the local leadership was unable to force the residents of the city to turn in their weapons. This action was deemed excessive and was revoked by the Israeli military governor of the Gaza Strip, however. Organized armed struggle against Israel peaked between 1969 and 1971, but was largely crushed by the Israel Defense Forces (IDF) under the command of Ariel Sharon. Ehud Yaari recounted that "by the beginning of 1970, 90% of Arab terrorism in Gaza was directed against Arab men and women employed by Israeli companies." After the killing, by a grenade thrown at their car, of one Jewish family, Sharon conducted a year long operation, authorized by Shlomo Gazit,  involving the demolition of homes and the employment of special assassination teams that killed suspects. Entire families identified as those related to men suspected of  terrorism, one numbering up to 50 member, were rounded up and bussed to remote camps in the desert and detained there for a year. Another camp served to sequester unemployed gazan youths not suspected of anything. The Red Cross described their treatment there as 'merciless'. The purpose was to dissuade other families from allowing their sons to join Fatah.

In 1971, the Israeli Army attempted to disperse the high concentration of Palestinian refugees in al-Shati camp and developed new housing schemes that resulted in the establishment of the northern Sheikh Radwan district. The United Nations Relief and Works Agency (UNRWA) and the PLO were vociferous in their opposition to the move, claiming it was forced resettlement. In 1972, Gaza's military governor dismissed the city's mayor, Rashad al-Shawwa, for refusing to annex al-Shati camp to the municipality of Gaza. Since the 1970s, frequent conflicts erupted between Palestinians and the Israeli authorities in the city, leading to the First Intifada in 1987. Gaza became a center of confrontation during this uprising.  The end result has been the devastation of Gaza's economy and of the lives of its residents.

Palestinian control

Palestinian Authority
In September 1993, leaders of Israel and the PLO signed the Oslo Accords calling for Palestinian administration of the Gaza Strip and the West Bank town of Jericho, which was implemented in May 1994. Israeli forces withdrew from Gaza, leaving a new Palestinian National Authority (PNA) to administer and police the city. Led by Yasser Arafat, the PNA chose Gaza as its first provincial headquarters. The newly established Palestinian National Council held its inaugural session in Gaza in March 1996.

In 2005, Israel implemented its unilateral disengagement plan under which it unilaterally withdrew Israeli armed forces and settlements from the Gaza Strip, including the Philadelphi Route, a narrow strip adjacent to the Gaza border with Egypt. Hamas won a surprise victory in the Palestinian elections of 2006, and has been engaged in a violent power struggle with Fatah.

Hamas administration

In 2007, Hamas overthrew Fatah forces in the Gaza Strip and Hamas members were dismissed from the PNA government in the West Bank in response. Currently, Hamas has de facto control of the city and Strip. Israel bombarded Gaza and nearby cities in the Gaza Strip in an air and ground assault codenamed "Operation Summer Rains" with the aim to end continued Qassam rocket attacks launched by Hamas and Islamic Jihad, and to secure the release of an Israeli soldier captured by Palestinian militants.

In March 2008, a human rights coalition charged that the humanitarian situation in Gaza had reached its worst point since Israel occupied the territory in the 1967 Six-Day War. On December 27–28, 2008 Israel commenced air strikes against Gaza, codenamed "Operation Cast Lead". Israel stated the strikes were in response to repetitive rocket and mortar attacks from the Gaza Strip into Israel since 2005, while the Palestinians stated that they were responding to Israel's military excursions and the blockade of the Gaza Strip. By January 3, 2009, Israeli tanks and infantry were invading Gaza with air and naval support. Thirteen Israelis, including ten soldiers were killed, while, according to Palestinian sources, a total of more than 1,300 Palestinians were killed and 5,500 injured. In addition 4,000 buildings were destroyed and 20,000 damaged throughout the Gaza Strip. Israel began an operation in Gaza on 14 November 2012, lasting eight days. On 7 July 2014, Hamas took responsibility for rocket attacks against Israel after several of their members where killed, leading to Israel launching an operation the next day. In May 2021, another round of fighting took place between Israel and Hamas in Gaza, lasting eleven days.

See also
 History of Palestine
 Gaza Strip
 List of rulers of Gaza

Notes

Citations

Sources

 
 
 
 
 
 .  (13).
 
 
 
 
 
 
 
 
 
 
   (13).

External links

 
Gaza